The Delta J, or Thor-Delta J was an American expendable launch system of the late 1960s. Only one was launched, with the Explorer 38 spacecraft. It was a member of the Delta family of rockets.

The Delta J was derived from the Delta E. The first stage was a Thor missile in the DSV-2C configuration, with three Castor-1 solid rocket boosters clustered around it. A Delta E was used as the second stage. The Altair third stage of the Delta E was replaced with the more powerful Star 37D SRM.

The only Delta J to fly was launched from Vandenberg Air Force Base Space Launch Complex 2E on 4 July 1968. It successfully placed the Explorer 38 satellite into medium Earth orbit.

References

Delta (rocket family)